Ames Field  is a private use airport in Levy County, Florida, United States. It is located three nautical miles (6 km) southwest of the central business district of Trenton, a city in Gilchrist County. It is owned by Bill J. Haynes. It used to be a public use airport owned by Alicia Ames Steele.

Facilities and aircraft 
Ames Field covers an area of 70 acres (28 ha) at an elevation of 64 feet (20 m) above mean sea level. It has one runway designated 18/36 with a turf surface measuring 2,600 by 75 feet (792 x 23 m).

For the 12-month period ending August 31, 2001, the airport had 1,200 general aviation aircraft operations, an average of 100 per month.

See also 
 List of airports in Florida

References

External links 
 Aerial image as of December 1998 from USGS The National Map
 

Airports in Florida
Transportation buildings and structures in Levy County, Florida